Rojhan  is a city and headquarters for Rojhan Tehsil in Rajanpur District, Punjab, Pakistan.

References

Populated places in Rajanpur District